The Doiwala–Dehradun–Uttarkashi–Maneri Gangotri Railway, notified as the project of national strategic importance, is Indian Railways's one of the four constituent routes of the proposed Char Dham Railway connecting the holiest Chota Char Dham of Hinduism. This 131 km route starts from the existing Doiwala station near Dehradun and will terminate at Maneri close to Gangotri.

Railway routes
The 131 km route from Doiwala via Uttarkashi ends at Maneri at 1270 m above mean sea level.

Current status
Char Dham Railway project's 327 km long construction, costing INR ₹43,292 crore (USD $6.6 billion), began with the foundation stone laying and commencement of INR ₹120 crore Final Location Survey (FSL) in May 2017 by the Union Railway minister.

And Survey Of Doiwala-Uttrakshi Line, And Karnaprayag-Gaurikund Line's Final Location Survey Has Been Completed By A Foreign Comoany In September 2020. As Informed By The Indian Railways Suresh Prabhu.

See also

 Uttarkashi–Palar Yamunotri Railway
 Saikot–Joshimath Badrinath Railway
 Karnaprayag–Saikot–Sonprayag Kedarnath Railway
 Rishikesh–Karnaprayag Railway
 Diamond Quadrilateral railway project
 Golden Quadrilateral road project
 Setu Bharatam railway crossing-free flyover and underpass project

References

Rail transport in Uttarakhand

Proposed railway lines in India
Transport in Dehradun